Hypatopa punctiferella is a moth in the family Blastobasidae. It is found in the United States, including Maryland, Pennsylvania, Kentucky, Texas and California, Florida and Ohio.

References

Moths described in 1863
Hypatopa